The 1920 Wicklow County Council election was held on Friday, 4 June 1920.

Council results

Results by electoral division

Arklow

Baltinglass

Bray

Wicklow

Notes 
1. Barton, who was also MP for West Wicklow, was imprisoned in Portland Prison at the time of the election.
2. Dulcibella Barton withdrew from the election, although she withdrew too late for her name to be removed from voting papers.
3. Byrne was at the time on the run.

References 

1920 Irish local elections
1920